Released in 1999 by Chrysalis Records, Sanctuary Medicines is the debut album of Scottish industrial rock artist Rico and the precursor to his independently released Violent Silences album.

Track listing

1999 albums